Bengal Chemicals & Pharmaceuticals Ltd. (BCPL), formerly Bengal Chemical & Pharmaceutical Works Ltd. (BCPW), is an Indian central public sector undertaking under the ownership of Ministry of Chemicals and Fertilizers, Government of India. lt manufactures industrial chemicals, pharmaceuticals like antibiotic injectables, tablets and capsules; and household products.

Established in Kolkata, West Bengal in 1901 by Prafulla Chandra Ray, it is India's first government owned-pharmaceutical-manufacturer. While initially successful, it started making losses in the mid-1950s. The management of the company was taken over by the Union government on 15 December 1977, and the company  was nationalised on 15 December 1980. Following decades of losses, BCPL returned to profitability in financial year 2016–17.

History

Beginnings 

Ray founded the company as an individual initiative with the intention with fostering a spirit of entrepreneurship among the Bengali youth, and provide an alternative to jobs from the colonial British government. The company presented its herbal products the 1893 session of the Indian Medical Congress in Kolkata.

The business was converted into a Limited Company, and on 12 April 1901 the company was renamed Bengal Chemical and Pharmaceutical Works Ltd. (BCPW), retaining the same premises at 91 Upper Circular Road, Calcutta. In 1908, John Cumming wrote in the "Review of the Industrial Position and Prospects in Bengal" that the "enterprise shows signs of resourcefulness and business capacity, which should be an object lesson to capitalists of this province".

From a beginning with one factory in Kolkata's Maniktala in 1905, three more factories were established – one in Panihati in 1920, one in Mumbai in 1938, and one in Kanpur in 1949, with its registered office at 6 Ganesh Chandra Avenue, Kolkata.

Struggles and nationalisation 
The company began to struggle after Roy's death in 1944, and started making losses in the mid-1950s. The management of the company was taken over by the Union government on 15 December 1977, followed by nationalisation on 15 December 1980. The new public sector undertaking was named Bengal Chemicals & Pharmaceuticals Ltd. (BCPL), and was launched on 27 March 1981. As its losses continued, BCPL was referred to the Board for Industrial and Financial Reconstruction in 1992.

Return to profitability 
After incurring losses for decades, the company managed to return to profitability in financial year 2016–17, and continued to report profits for 2 subsequent fiscals.

Hydroxychloroquine production during COVID-19 pandemic 
In view of the Indian Council of Medical Research recommending hydroxychloroquine for prophylaxis against COVID-19, BCPL received clearance to start manufacturing the drug.

Products
 Division I (Industrial Chemicals) - alum, bleaching powder
 Division II (Pharmaceuticals) - generic drugs, such as analgesics, antipyretics, antimicrobials (including antifungals, antibiotics and anti-tubercular drugs) and antiseptics; and branded drugs like Ray Cal (calcium with vitamin D3 and vitamin B12) and Hospitol (chloroxylenol)
 Division III (Home Products) - toiletries and household disinfectants

Privatization

On the 9th of February 2021, the Government of India announced the privatization of Bengal Chemicals and Fertilizers.

References

External links 
 

Government-owned companies of India
Chemical companies of India
Pharmaceutical companies of India
Pharmaceutical companies established in 1901
Manufacturing companies based in Kolkata
Indian companies established in 1901
Indian companies established in 1981